Ernesto Ferreira Félix Brunhoso (born 5 June 1980) commonly simple Kito is an Angolan-Portuguese retired footballer.

References

External links
Ernesto ForaDeJogo Profile

1980 births
Living people
Portuguese footballers
Association football forwards
Leça F.C. players
Gondomar S.C. players
S.C. Salgueiros players
S.C. Olhanense players
Diagoras F.C. players
Fostiras F.C. players
Ayia Napa FC players
C.D. Mafra players
Cypriot Second Division players
Gamma Ethniki players
Persitara Jakarta Utara players
IK Sirius Fotboll players
Enköpings SK players
Liga 1 (Indonesia) players
Primeira Liga players
Liga Portugal 2 players
Ettan Fotboll players
Segunda Divisão players
Portuguese expatriate sportspeople in Indonesia
Expatriate footballers in Indonesia
Expatriate footballers in Greece
Expatriate footballers in Cyprus
Expatriate footballers in Sweden